Ilija Ilić (born 26 April 1991) is a Serbian professional footballer who plays as a forward for USL League One club One Knoxville SC.

Career
Ilić began his career with the youth clubs of FK Čukarički and Red Star Belgrade, as well as a loan spell with FK Sopot during their 2010 and 2011 season.

Ilić played college soccer in the United States with Young Harris College between 2011 and 2014. While at college, he also spent time with USL PDL club Ocala Stampede.

After leaving college, he signed with USL club Louisville City on March 26, 2015.

Ilić signed for USL Championship side Indy Eleven on 3 December 2018.

On 14 December 2020 he moved to USL Championship side New Mexico United ahead of their 2021 season. He was released by New Mexico in July 2022.

On December 12, 2022, Ilić signed with USL League One club One Knoxville SC. He was the newly promoted club's first major signing announcement, and will also serve as assistant coach.

Career statistics

Honors

Club
Louisville City FC
USL Cup (2): 2017, 2018

References

External links
 
 
 Ilija Ilić at Louisville City FC
 Young Harris profile

1991 births
Living people
Footballers from Belgrade
Serbian footballers
Serbian expatriate footballers
FK Čukarički players
Red Star Belgrade footballers
Ocala Stampede players
Louisville City FC players
Indy Eleven players
New Mexico United players
Association football forwards
Expatriate soccer players in the United States
USL League Two players
USL Championship players
Serbian expatriate sportspeople in the United States
Young Harris Mountain Lions men's soccer players
USL League One coaches
Player-coaches
One Knoxville SC players